Marracuene District is a district of Maputo Province in southern Mozambique. The principal town is Marracuene. The district is located in the center of the province, and borders with Manhiça District in the north, the city of Maputo in the south, and with the city of Matola and with Moamba District in the west. In the east, the district is limited by the Indian Ocean. It has a population of 136,784 as of 2007.

Geography
The principal river in the district is the Incomati River.

Demographics
As of 2005, 41% of the population of the district was younger than 15 years of age. 59% of the population spoke Portuguese. The most common mother tongue among the population was xiRonga. 48% of the population were illiterate, mostly women.

Administrative divisions
The district is divided into two postos, Marracuene (three localities) and Machubo (two localities).

Economy
2% of the households in the district have access to electricity.

Agriculture
In the district, there are 10,000 farms with, on average,  of land. The main agricultural products are corn, cassava, cowpea, peanut, rice, and sweet potato.

Transportation
There is a road network in the district, which includes  of the national road EN1, running from Maputo north along the coast.

References

Notes

Sources
Hance, William A. and Irene S. Van Dongen.  "Lourenço Marques in Delagoa Bay."  Economic Geography 33.3 (1957): 238-256.
Wheeler, Douglas L. "Gungunyane the Negotiator: A Study in African Diplomacy."  The Journal of African History 9.4 (1968): 585-602.

Districts in Maputo Province